The 1918 Celebes Sea earthquake occurred on August 15 at 12:18 UTC near the Moro Gulf coast of Mindanao. It had a magnitude of 8.3 on the moment magnitude scale and a maximum perceived intensity of X (Extreme) on the Mercalli intensity scale. 

This event in the southern Philippines triggered a large tsunami, with a maximum run-up of 7.2 m, which affected the coasts of the Celebes Sea, causing widespread damage. The combined effects of the earthquake and the tsunami caused 52 casualties.

The earthquake has been associated with the Cotabato Trench, the surface expression of an active east-dipping subduction zone beneath Mindanao.

See also
1897 Mindanao earthquakes
1976 Moro Gulf earthquake 
List of earthquakes in 1918
List of earthquakes in the Philippines

References

External links

Earthquakes in the Philippines
1918 earthquakes
History of Sarangani
History of Sultan Kudarat
1918 tsunamis
Megathrust earthquakes in the Philippines